The 1936 All-Southwest Conference football team consists of American football players chosen by various organizations for All-Southwest Conference teams for the 1936 college football season.  The selectors for the 1936 season included the Associated Press (AP).

All Southwest selections

Backs
 Sammy Baugh, TCU (AP-1 [QB])
 Lloyd Russell, Baylor (AP-1 [HB])
 Jack Robbins, Arkansas (AP-1 [HB])
 Hugh Wolfe, Texas (AP-1 [FB])

Ends
 James Benton, Arkansas (AP-1)
 Walter Roach, Texas Christian (AP-1)

Tackles
 Roy Young, Texas A&M (AP-1)
 Owen Parry, Baylor (AP-1)

Guards
 Joe Routt, Texas A&M (AP-1)
 Paschal Scortino, Southern Methodist (AP-1)

Centers
 Charles Deware, Texas A&M (AP-1)

Key
AP = Associated Press

See also
 1936 College Football All-America Team

References

All-Southwest Conference
All-Southwest Conference football teams